A Song Is Born (also known as That's Life), starring Danny Kaye and Virginia Mayo, is a 1948 Technicolor musical film remake of Howard Hawks'  1941 movie Ball of Fire with Gary Cooper and Barbara Stanwyck. This version was also directed by Hawks, based on the story "From A to Z" by Billy Wilder and Thomas Monroe, adapted by Harry Tugend (uncredited) and produced by Samuel Goldwyn and released by RKO Radio Pictures.

Filmed in Technicolor, it featured a stellar supporting cast of musical legends, including Tommy Dorsey, Benny Goodman (with Al Hendrickson as cameo), Louis Armstrong, Lionel Hampton, and Benny Carter. Other notable musicians playing themselves in the cast include Charlie Barnet (with Harry Babasin as cameo), Mel Powell, Louis Bellson, The Golden Gate Quartet, Russo and the Samba Kings, The Page Cavanaugh Trio, and Buck and Bubbles. Other actors include Steve Cochran and Hugh Herbert.

Plot
In the Totten Foundation’s Victorian mansion in New York City, mild-mannered Professor Hobart Frisbee (Danny Kaye) and his seven fellow academics, among them Professor Magenbruch (Benny Goodman), are writing and recording a comprehensive musical encyclopedia. They have been living cut off from the world for 9 years, living without a radio. Thanks to two window washers (Buck and Bubbles) seeking help with a radio quiz, they discover that there are many forms of popular music—including swing, jive, jump, blues, two-beat Dixie, boogie woogie, and bebop—that they know nothing about. Hobart, the expert on “folk music” goes out and explores the music scene before, during and after hours, inviting all the artists he meets to come to the Foundation.

The professors become entangled in the problems of nightclub singer Honey Swanson (Virginia Mayo). She needs a place to hide out from the police, who want to question her about her gangster boyfriend Tony Crow (Steve Cochran). Tony wants to marry her—because a wife cannot testify against her husband. Honey invites herself into the sheltered household, over the objections of Hobart and Miss Bragg, the housekeeper. The songs they play include "A Song Is Born", "Daddy-O", "I'm Getting Sentimental Over You", "Flying Home", and "Redskin Rumba".

When Miss Bragg delivers an ultimatum, Honey persuades Hobart to let her stay by telling him she is “wacky” about him and introducing him to “yum yum”, i.e. enthusiastic kissing. Smitten, the innocent Hobart (who graduated from Princeton at age 13) scours the city for an open jewelry store so he can buy an engagement ring. He proposes the next morning. They are interrupted by a phone call from her “Daddy”. Pretending to be her father, Tony easily persuades Hobart to come to Rancocas, New Jersey to be married. Delighted, all the professors join in the elopement. (Honey knocks Miss Bragg out and locks her in the closet.)

A minor accident lands them in an inn near Kingston. There, Honey—who is feeling very guilty and is deeply moved by what she has learned about Hobart—realizes that she has fallen in love with him. Tony and his men arrive and reveal the truth. When Hobart goes to tell her that “Daddy's here,” Miss Bragg arrives with the police. Hobart sends them away. Honey shows him her excuses—a blank sheet of paper.

At the Foundation, the professors refuse Miss Bragg's offer of breakfast. Miss Totten and her lawyer arrive, planning to close down the Foundation. Tony's two men break in and hold everyone at gunpoint. Meanwhile, Honey refuses to marry Tony, even though she will never see Frizzy again. Tony descends on the Foundation with Honey and a very deaf justice of the peace and forces Honey to go through the ceremony by threatening the professors and the assembled musicians. When Hobart learns that Honey is being forced, the hostages join to overwhelm the gunmen. The finale, of course, is not decided by guns but by music, its resonance and reverberation, as, inspired by Joshua Fit the Battle of Jericho, the musicians send a drum crashing on one of the henchmen and a professor pulls the rug out from under the other. Frizzy gives Tony a beating.

Hobart overcomes Honey's objections to their marriage—she feels unworthy—with his own compelling demonstration of “yum yum”.

Cast

 Danny Kaye as Professor Hobart Frisbee
 Virginia Mayo as Honey Swanson
 Benny Goodman as Professor Magenbruch
 Tommy Dorsey as himself
 Louis Armstrong as himself
 Charlie Barnet as himself
 Lionel Hampton as himself
 Mel Powell as himself
 Louis Bellson as himself
 Buck and Bubbles
 Buck Washington as Buck
 John William Sublett as Bubbles
 The Page Cavanaugh Trio as Themselves
 The Golden Gate Quartet as Themselves
 Russo and the Samba Kings as Themselves
 Hugh Herbert as Professor Twingle
 Steve Cochran as Tony Crow
 J. Edward Bromberg as Dr. Elfini
 Felix Bressart as Professor Gerkikoff
 Ludwig Stossel as Professor Traumer
 O.Z. Whitehead as Professor Oddly
 Esther Dale as Miss Bragg
 Mary Field as Miss Totten
 Howland Chamberlin as Mr. Setter
 Paul Langton as Joe
 Sidney Blackmer as Adams
 Ben Welden as Monte
 Ben Chasen as Ben
 Peter Virgo as Louis

Music
 "A Song is Born"
 "Daddy-O"
 Sung by Virginia Mayo (dubbed) and performed by Jeri Sullavan
 Words and music by Don Raye and Gene De Paul
 Orchestration by Sonny Burke
 Musical direction by Emil Newman and Hugo Friedhofer

Production
Kaye's personal writer/composer, Sylvia Fine, who also happened to be Kaye's wife, refused to take part in any more of his projects because Kaye had recently left her for actress Eve Arden. Kaye didn't want anyone else writing songs for him, so he did not perform any songs in the film.

Hawks had little interest in remaking his own earlier movie, and only came to work on it because of the $250,000 paycheck. When speaking of the film, he said "Danny Kaye had separated from his wife, and he was a basket case, stopping work to see a psychiatrist [every] day. He was about as funny as a crutch. I never thought anything in that picture was funny. It was an altogether horrible experience...and Virginia Mayo's performance was 'pathetic'... she's not Barbara Stanwyck, I'll tell you that."

Release
A Song Is Born was the number one film in the country from the time of its release until November 1948, while Hawks's other (and in his opinion, best) film, Red River, was second. However, A Song Is Born never broke even, only earning about $2.2 million (equivalent to $  million in ), while Red River went on to gross $4.1 million.  It has since been released on home video in both VHS and DVD formats.

References

External links 
 
A Song is Born at TCM
 
 

1948 musical films
1948 films
Films directed by Howard Hawks
Films set in New York City
Musical film remakes
Samuel Goldwyn Productions films
Jazz films
Films with screenplays by Billy Wilder
American musical films
1940s English-language films
1940s American films